The 2017 Tournament of Nations was the inaugural Tournament of Nations, an international women's football tournament, consisting of a series of friendly games. It was held in the United States, from July 27 to August 3, 2017, and featured four teams.

Format
The tournament featured the national teams of Australia, Brazil, Japan, and the hosts, the United States, competing in a round-robin format, with each team playing every other once. Three points are awarded for a win, one for a draw, and none for a loss. Current FIFA Ranking is important, as it is one of the tie-breaking criteria.

Venues
Three cities along the west coast served as the venues for the tournament.

Squads

Matches

All times are local PDT (UTC−7).

Goalscorers
26 goals were scored in 6 matches, for an average of  goals per matches.
4 goals

 Sam Kerr

2 goals

 Lisa De Vanna
 Caitlin Foord
 Andressa
 Camila
 Yuka Momiki
 Megan Rapinoe

1 goal

 Tameka Butt
 Emily van Egmond
 Katrina Gorry
 Bruna Benites
 Mina Tanaka
 Julie Ertz
 Sam Mewis
 Alex Morgan
 Christen Press
 Mallory Pugh

Television coverage
The ESPN family of networks carried all tournament games.  Games were shown on ESPN, ESPN2, and ESPN3.

References

Tournament of Nations
2017 Tournament of Nations
2017 in American women's soccer
2017 in women's association football
July 2017 sports events in the United States
August 2017 sports events in the United States
Soccer in California
Soccer in Seattle
Sports competitions in Seattle
Sports competitions in Carson, California
Sports competitions in San Diego
2017 in sports in California
2017 in sports in Washington (state)